Inalegolo is a village in Kgalagadi District of Botswana. It is located in the north-east part of the district, in Kalahari Desert, it has a primary school and a health post. The population was 533 in 2011 census.
The chief of the village is Kgosi Keamogetse Ghubi.

References

Kgalagadi District
Villages in Botswana